The sixth season of Power Couple premiered on Monday, May 2, 2022, at  on RecordTV.

The show features thirteen celebrity couples living under one roof and facing extreme challenges that will test how well they really know each other. Each week, a couple will be eliminated until the last couple wins the grand prize.

Adriane Galisteu returned for her second season as the main host, alongside Lidi Lisboa, who is also returning for her second season but, this time, being joined by Lucas Selfie as the show's online hosts and correspondents.

Brenda Paixão & Matheus Sampaio won the competition with 53.88% of the public vote over Mussunzinho & Karol Menezes and Adryana Ribeiro & Albert Bressan and took home the R$330.000 prize they accumulated during the show. Mussunzinho & Karol received a brand new car as the runners-up and Adryana & Albert received R$50.000.

Cast
The couples were officially revealed by RecordTV on April 27, 2022.

Couples

Future Appearances
In 2022, Claudia Baronesa (from Baronesa & Rogério) appeared in A Fazenda 14, she entered in the Warehouse where the public voted for one contestant to move into the main house, she didn't received enough votes to enter in the game.

The game
Key

Challenges' results

Notes

Special power
This season, the couples' challenge winning couple also becomes the week's Power Couple. At the nomination ceremony, the couple will randomly picked two out of three balls from different colors (black, green or pink). Then, the couple would be given a choice between two advantages in the game; the couple's choice is marked in bold.

Voting history

Notes

Inheritance power
This season, each eliminated couple will be entitled to an "inheritance". The couple must to delegate, in advance, which couples would hold the Golden ball which will unleash good and bad consequences in the upcoming cycle, with one of the powers defined by the public through the show's profile on R7.com among two options.

Room status

Ratings and reception

Brazilian ratings
All numbers are in points and provided by Kantar Ibope Media.

References

External links
 Power Couple 6 on R7.com

2022 Brazilian television seasons
Power Couple (Brazilian TV series)